The 'Vaduga' or 'Vadugar', comprise three distinct Telugu-speaking caste-based communities of what is now the state of Tamil Nadu in India. They are families who moved south to the region from north Madras presidency following the collapse of the Vijayanagara Empire after 1565, settling in contiguous areas of Tirunelveli, Madurai. Their original caste identities were as Kammavars,Palaekari and Kapu Naidu and they were once been prominent in the Vijayanagara imperial court.

The Vatuka engaged in agriculture in the arid area of Tirunelveli, perhaps because they had experience of cultivating such land but perhaps also because the other dominant group in the area - the Maravars a Tamizh Speaking Tamizh Nationality Clan- had already Soil of Son's in the more fertile places. People such as Veerapandiya Kattabomman, Tirumala Nayaka, Maharaani Mangammal, Virupatchi Gopala Naicker are some historical leaders and kings of Tamil Nadu Nayakar Kingdoms.

References 

Social groups of Tamil Nadu